Kendrick Duran Burton (born September 7, 1973) is a former American football defensive lineman. He played college football for Alabama and was selected in the fourth round of the 1996 NFL Draft by the Houston Oilers.The long road to the NFL</ref>

A native of Decatur, Alabama, Burton was an All-American selection at Hartselle High School.

As a senior at Alabama, Burton was close friends with Shaun Alexander.

References 

1973 births
Living people
Sportspeople from Decatur, Alabama
Players of American football from Alabama
American football defensive linemen
Alabama Crimson Tide football players
Houston Oilers players
Barcelona Dragons players
Birmingham Thunderbolts players